The 1990–1991 international cricket season was from September 1990 to April 1991.

Season overview

October

New Zealand in Pakistan

November

West Indies in Pakistan

England in Australia

Sri Lanka in India

1990-91 Benson & Hedges World Series

December

1990-91 Sharjah Cup

1990-91 Asia Cup

January

Sri Lanka in New Zealand

February

England in New Zealand

Australia in the West Indies

References

1990 in cricket
1991 in cricket